Keats's Neighborhood is a 2002 children's picture book collecting several works by American author and illustrator Ezra Jack Keats.  The collection brings together nine of his stories, including the 1963 Caldecott Medal-winning book The Snowy Day, Caldecott Honor book Goggles! and Peter's Chair. It includes an introduction to his work by Anita Silvey, a brief biography, and a section of comments on his legacy by other writers and illustrators.

2002 children's books
Children's short story collections
American picture books
Books by Ezra Jack Keats